Nuit (alternatively Nu, Nut, or Nuith) is a goddess in Thelema, the speaker in the first Chapter of The Book of the Law, the sacred text written or received in 1904 by Aleister Crowley.

Based on the Ancient Egyptian sky goddess Nut, who arches over her husband/brother, Geb (Earth god). She is usually depicted as a naked woman who is covered with stars.

Goddess of Thelema
Within this system, she is one-third of the triadic cosmology, along with Hadit (her masculine counterpart), and Ra-Hoor-Khuit, the Crowned and Conquering Child. She has several titles, including "Our Lady of the Stars", and "Lady of the Starry Heaven". In The Book of the Law she says of herself: "I am Infinite Space, and the Infinite Stars thereof", and in other sections she is called "Queen of Heaven," and "Queen of Space." Nuit is symbolized by a sphere whose circumference is nowhere and whose center is everywhere, whereas Hadit is the infinitely small point at the center of this sphere. According to Thelemic doctrine, it is the interaction between these two cosmic principles that creates the manifested universe similar to the gnostic syzygy.

Some quotes from the first two chapters of The Book of the Law (Liber AL vel Legis):

"Every man and every woman is a star." (AL I:3).
"Come forth, o children, under the stars, & take your fill of love!" (AL I:12).
"Since I am Infinite Space, and the Infinite Stars thereof, do ye also thus. Bind nothing!" (AL I:22). 
"Then the priest answered & said unto the Queen of Space, kissing her lovely brows [...]" (AL I:27).
"For I am divided for love's sake, for the chance of union." (AL I:29).
"Then the priest fell into a deep trance or swoon, & said unto the Queen of Heaven; Write unto us the ordeals; write unto us the rituals; write unto us the law!" (AL I:33).
"Invoke me under my stars! Love is the law, love under will. [...]" (AL I:57).
"I give unimaginable joys on earth: certainty, not faith, while in life, upon death; peace unutterable, rest, ecstasy; nor do I demand aught in sacrifice." (AL I:58).
"I am the blue-lidded daughter of Sunset; I am the naked brilliance of the voluptuous night-sky." (AL I:64).
"In the sphere I am everywhere the centre, as she, the circumference, is nowhere found." (AL II:3).

The following are quotes from Crowley's commentaries to The Book of the Law.

 "Note that Heaven is not a place where Gods Live; Nuit is Heaven, itself."
 "Nuit is All that which exists, and the condition of that existence. Hadit is the Principle which causes modifications in this Being. This explains how one may call Nuit Matter, and Hadit Motion."
 "It should be evident that Nuit obtains the satisfaction of Her Nature when the parts of Her Body fulfill their own Nature. The sacrament of life is not only so from the point of view of the celebrants, but from that of the divinity invoked."

See also
 Ancient Egyptian deities
 Astrotheology
Laws of Form
 Mark and space

References

Citations

Works cited

Further reading
Crowley, Aleister (1974). The Equinox of the Gods. New York, NY : Gordon Press.

External links
 

Magic goddesses
Mother goddesses
Night goddesses
Sky and weather goddesses
Stellar goddesses
Thelema